Bakhtiyar Shakhabutdinovich Akhmedov (born 5 August 1987 in Buynaksk, Dagestan) is a Russian wrestler of Kumyk descent. Olympic gold medalist 2008.

Akhmedov competed at the 2008 Summer Olympics in 120 kg category. In the finals, he lost to Artur Taymazov of Uzbekistan and was awarded silver medal. However, Taymazov was later stripped of his medal due to a positive doping test, thus Akhmedov was awarded gold.

References

External links
 

1987 births
Living people
People from Buynaksk
Kumyks
Olympic wrestlers of Russia
Wrestlers at the 2008 Summer Olympics
Olympic gold medalists for Russia
Olympic medalists in wrestling
Medalists at the 2008 Summer Olympics
Russian male sport wrestlers
Sportspeople from Dagestan
21st-century Russian people